Nikolai Ivanovich Gusarov (16 August 1905 – 17 March 1985) was the first secretary of the Communist Party of Byelorussia from 7 March 1947 until 3 June 1950.

1905 births
1985 deaths
People from Nikolayevsk
People from Astrakhan Governorate
Central Committee of the Communist Party of the Soviet Union candidate members
Presidium of the Supreme Soviet
First convocation members of the Soviet of the Union
Second convocation members of the Soviet of the Union
Third convocation members of the Soviet of the Union
Fourth convocation members of the Soviet of the Union
Heads of the Communist Party of Byelorussia
Moscow Aviation Institute alumni
Recipients of the Order of Lenin

Recipients of the Order of the Red Banner of Labour